Olgania is a genus of spiders in the family Anapidae. It was first described in 1979 by Hickman. , it contains 5 species, all found in Tasmania.

References

Anapidae
Araneomorphae genera
Spiders of Australia